Dan Baranik (born February 28, 1962) is an American football coach.  He served as the head football coach at Waynesburg University from 1994 to 2000, compiling a record of 32–32.

Head coaching record

College

References

External links
 Guilford profile 

1962 births
Living people
Army Black Knights football coaches
Guilford Quakers football coaches
Lehigh Mountain Hawks football coaches
Lock Haven Bald Eagles football coaches
Maryland Terrapins football coaches
Olivet Nazarene Tigers football coaches
Shippensburg Red Raiders football coaches
Waynesburg Yellow Jackets football coaches
High school football coaches in Virginia
Shippensburg University of Pennsylvania alumni